David Wolstencroft (born 16 July 1969), is an American-born British screenwriter and author. He is best known as creator of the BAFTA award-winning TV spy drama Spooks and its spin-off series, Spooks: Code 9.

Early life
Wolstencroft was born in Honolulu, Hawaii, United States in 1969 and grew up in Edinburgh, Scotland, studying at George Watson's College, later going on to read history at Emmanuel College, Cambridge. While at Cambridge, he was active in the Footlights where he collaborated with Mark Evans, Sue Perkins, Andy Parsons, Alexander Armstrong and Ben Miller, and had served as Footlight's vice-president and revue director.

Career
Wolstencroft won the Royal Television Society's Network Newcomer award after producing his first drama, Psychos, for Channel 4 in 1999. He then began working on Spooks. The pilot episode was watched by over 9 million people (a 41% share) and the series won a number of BAFTA awards and nominations.

More recently, he has written, created and executive produced The Escape Artist for BBC One and Versailles for Canal+ with fellow Spooks scribe and ex-Criminal Minds producer and writer Simon Mirren. Wolstencroft also wrote the screenplay for the film Shooting Dogs. He is also the author of two espionage thriller novels: Good News, Bad News and Contact Zero, which was nominated for the Ian Fleming Silver Dagger.

References

External links
 
 

1969 births
Living people
People educated at George Watson's College
Alumni of Emmanuel College, Cambridge
British thriller writers
British spy fiction writers
British television writers
British male screenwriters
Scottish thriller writers
Scottish novelists
British male television writers